Willy Merkl (6 October 1900 – 15/17 July 1934) was a German mountain climber who is most notable for his attempt to lead a German-American team up Nanga Parbat (the Naked Mountain) in the Himalayas in 1932.

His team were known to be very experienced in Alpine and European mountain expeditions, but were unprepared for the trials of the Himalayas. Despite being forced to turn back, the team did make excellent progress and found a way through the Rakhiot Peak and the main ridge.

In 1934 he led another expedition up the same mountain that proved to be fatal. Although this expedition was better prepared and financed by Nazi Germany, due in large part to the Nazis' desire to symbolically 'conquer any peak', the weather proved too strong and overtook the climbers. On July 6, the team was at a good point to attempt the final stretch of the climb. Had the climbers set out right then, some could have likely been well on their way to the top. However, Merkl wanted the entire team to arrive at the same time, so they waited a day to rest the group, assuming all would be well. Instead, the next day saw the beginning of a snowstorm and blizzard that lasted for nine days. When it let up, Merkl, two other members of the team, and six sherpas were dead. It is apparent that their deaths had been slow and extremely arduous, caused by an extended exposure to cold and starvation.

Merkl's frozen body, and that of Sherpa Gaylay, were found in 1938 after another German expedition stumbled upon the snow cave in which they had taken refuge.

,
Merkl's half-brother, initiated and then led the Willy-Merkl-Gedächtnisexpedition, the 1953 German–Austrian Nanga Parbat expedition which was the first to reach the summit.

References

1900 births
1934 deaths
German military personnel of World War I
German mountain climbers
Mountaineering deaths
Sport deaths in Pakistan